Rock & Republic is an American jeans brand founded by Michael Ball in 2002.  Ball is a cyclist who gained design experience by creating his cycling team's uniforms.  Rock & Republic's line of jeans and casual wear "VB Rocks" was designed by singer Victoria Beckham until 2008.

Timelines
From 2007 to 2009, the company sponsored a professional cycling team named Rock Racing.

On April 1, 2010, Rock & Republic filed for Chapter 11 bankruptcy protection.  By December 2010, the company had entered into negotiations with VF Corporation to sell the trademark and intellectual property. On April 28, 2011, VF Corporation announced it had signed a long-term licensing deal with Kohl's Corporation to carry a budget version of the Rock & Republic brand with jeans priced at $88 versus $200 plus. In 2019, VF Corporation spun-off its jeans business, including the Rock & Republic, Lee, and Wrangler brands, into a new business called Kontoor Brands.

See also
VF Corporation
Lee (jeans)
Wrangler (jeans)

References 

Clothing brands of the United States
Jeans by brand
2002 establishments in the United States
Companies that filed for Chapter 11 bankruptcy in 2010